Paul Boudehent (born 21 November 1999) is a French rugby union player, who currently plays as a flanker for La Rochelle in the Top 14.

Early life
Paul Boudehent started rugby in Angers, then moved to Nantes in 2014 and finally joined the La Rochelle youth system in 2017.

International career
On 17 January 2023, Boudehent was first called by Fabien Galthié to the France national team for the 2023 Six Nations Championship.

Personal life
Boudehent is the younger brother of Pierre Boudehent, who also plays at La Rochelle as a centre or a wing.

Honours

La Rochelle
 European Rugby Champions Cup: 2021–22
 European Rugby Champions Cup runner-up: 2020–21
 Top 14 runner-up: 2020-21

References

External links
 Stade Rochelais
 EPCR
 All.Rugby
 It's Rugby

1999 births
People from Angers
Living people
French rugby union players
Rugby union flankers
Stade Rochelais players